Adams was an English automobile manufactured in Bedford, England, between 1905 and 1914.

Arthur Henry Adams had founded the Igranic Works in Bedford in 1899 to make electrical equipment. American-born Edward R. Hewitt had helped Sir Hiram Maxim to build a large steam plane in 1894.  He later designed a "gas buggy" along the lines of an Oldsmobile and following agreement with Adams production of the car started in 1905 as the Adams-Hewitt.

The Adams-Hewitt had a supposedly foolproof two, later three, speed-epicyclic transmission with a 1724 cc 10 hp single-cylinder engine located horizontally in the middle of the chassis driving the rear wheels by chain.  Indeed, "Pedals to push, that's all" was used as the marque's slogan.

Hewitt eventually returned to the United States to manufacture similar cars under his own name and his name was dropped from the British produced cars.

In 1906 a range of more conventional cars was introduced with shaft-drive and vertical engines and from 1907 sliding mesh gearboxes. One of these was supplied to the Emperor of Abyssinia.  Models offered included two- and four-cylinder ones and one of the first British V-8s; this last had a 7270 cc 35/40 hp  engine based on the French Antoinette model (an aero engine for which Adams were agents).  The V-8 seems to have been plagued by crankshaft breakages.

The last single-cylinder cars were made in 1909.

In 1910, the company produced an advanced 16 hp four-cylinder  model with front-wheel brakes; it came with compressed-air starting, tire-inflating, and jacking equipment.  The "pedals-to-push" gear was still offered, as was a conventional four-speed transmission and an unusual planetary gearchange (three-speed), which was operated by a pedal that moved in a gate.

The company stopped making cars in 1914, and the factory became Brookhirst-Igranic which eventually became part of Metal Industries, Limited.

A. H. Adams was lost on the Lusitania in 1915.

See also
 List of car manufacturers of the United Kingdom

References

Defunct motor vehicle manufacturers of England
Cars introduced in 1905
Brass Era vehicles
Companies based in Bedfordshire
Bedford
Vehicle manufacturing companies established in 1905
Vehicle manufacturing companies disestablished in 1914
1905 establishments in England
1914 disestablishments in England
British companies disestablished in 1914
British companies established in 1905